Peter Andrew Furler (born 8 September 1966) is an Australian musician, songwriter, producer and record executive, best known as the co-founder and former lead vocalist of the Christian rock band Newsboys.

Biography
Furler was born in McLaren Vale, South Australia on 8 September 1966, the third of six children of missionaries Bill and Rosalie Furler. Furler formed the Newsboys in 1985 with friends George Perdikis, Sean Taylor, and John James. He has written and produced most of Newsboys' songs, as well as co-writing/producing songs for other recording artists. He also frequently collaborated with Steve Taylor. Furler was originally the band's drummer, but became the band's lead singer after the departure of John James in 1997.

In July 1999, Furler, along with fellow Australians Dale Bray and Wes Campbell, founded Inpop Records.

In 2009, Furler left the Newsboys and began pursuing a solo career. He continued to make special appearances on tour with the band until his final appearance on 11 September 2009, in Orlando, Florida. Furler released his debut solo album, On Fire, on 21 June 2011 . The first single from the album, "Reach", was released to radio 25 March 2011 for sale on 19 April 2011. Furler participated in the Winter Jam 2012 tour.

In 2010, Furler became the drummer for longtime Newsboys songwriting collaborator Steve Taylor's new band, Steve Taylor & The Perfect Foil. Their album, Goliath, was released on 18 November 2014. Furler also played drums for former Newsboy Phil Joel's album deliberateKids2.

Furler formed the Peter Furler Band in 2012. The band includes Dave Ghazarian (formerly of Superchick and Audio Adrenaline) on bass and Jeff Irizarry on drums. Their album, Sun and Shield, was released on 11 March 2014.

On 7 October 2014, Furler released Christmas, his first Christmas album, on which he collaborated with pianist and guitarist David Ian.

In 2017, Furler collaborated with the Newsboys again for "The Cross Has the Final Word" single, which was his first involvement in the band since leaving in 2009. Since 2018, he has toured with Newsboys together with Phil Joel billed as Newsboys United. They recorded the album, United, released in 2019.

Personal life
Furler married Summer Andrea LeFevre, daughter of musician Mylon LeFevre, on 12 March 1991.

He is the cousin of singer-songwriter Sia.

With Newsboys

 (1988) Read All About It, drums and some vocals
 (1990) Hell Is for Wimps, drums and some vocals
 (1991) Boys Will Be Boyz, drums and some vocals
 (1992) Not Ashamed, lead vocals (with John James), drums, songwriting and co-production (with Steve Taylor)
 (1994) Going Public, lead vocals (with John James), drums, programming, songwriting and co-production (with Steve Taylor)
 (1996) Take Me To Your Leader, lead vocals (with John James), drums, guitar, keyboard, harmonica, kazoo, songwriting and co-production (with Steve Taylor)
 (1998) Step Up to the Microphone, lead vocals (with Jody Davis and Phil Joel), guitar, drums, songwriting and production
 (1999) Love Liberty Disco, lead vocals, guitar, drums, songwriting and production 
 (2002) Thrive, lead vocals, guitar, drums, songwriting and production
 (2003) Adoration: The Worship Album, lead vocals, guitar, drums, songwriting and production
 (2004) Devotion, lead vocals, guitar, drums, songwriting and production
 (2006) GO, lead vocals, guitar, drums, songwriting and production
 (2009) In the Hands of God, lead vocals, guitar, drums, songwriting and production
 (2019) United, lead vocals, guitar, drums, songwriting and co-production (with Geoff Duncan)

Solo discography

Studio albums

Singles

Compilation contributions and featured songs

References

External links
 

1966 births
Living people
Australian performers of Christian music
Australian songwriters
People from McLaren Vale, South Australia
Sparrow Records artists
Steve Taylor & The Perfect Foil members
Newsboys members
20th-century Australian male singers
21st-century Australian male singers
Peter Furler Band members